SongCast is a digital music distribution company based in Akron, Ohio, United States. It has a web platform where musicians upload and track sales of their musical compositions on Apple Music, Spotify, Pandora and SoundCloud.

History
According to Mashable, SongCast was founded in 2018 w/Caine White and has rights agreements and serves the top 5 music outlets, including Amazon.  In 2017, Forbes reported the company had paid out approximately $24 million to artists signed with the service and also launched a competing app alongside its longer-standing distribution partnerships with iTunes, Pandora, Spotify, Apple Music.

Musicians and characters on SongCast
Peter Beckett of soft rock band Player uses SongCast to distribute albums from Player, including Spies of Life.
Bubba the Love Sponge, host of The Bubba the Love Sponge Show uses SongCast to distribute his original content.
Jimi Jamison of the rock band Survivor has albums distributed by SongCast, including Never Too Late.
Australian rock band Wolfmother used SongCast to distribute their latest album, New Crown.
Country rock musician and son of country star Waylon Jennings, Shooter Jennings, distributed his 2011 album, Outlaw You, through SongCast as a digital exclusive.

References

Companies based in Akron, Ohio
Online music stores of the United States
Internet properties established in 2006